Miltos Gofas (born 7 January 1957) is a Greek football manager.

References

1957 births
Living people
Greek football managers
Rouf F.C. managers
Paniliakos F.C. managers
Vyzas F.C. managers
Kalamata F.C. managers
GAS Ialysos 1948 F.C. managers
Achaiki F.C. managers
Sportspeople from Athens